In Canada, Crown Attorney Office refers to the offices in each province that are in charge of prosecuting the majority of criminal cases. For the most part, each office is under the jurisdiction of the provincial Attorney General (or the Minister of Justice in Quebec), who is responsible for the conduct of criminal prosecutions at the provincial level.

The offices are generally spread out across each province by municipal districts (county, regional municipality, etc.). Large cities like Toronto have several Crown Attorney Offices. Each office reports to the provincial Attorney General (or Minister of Justice).

In British Columbia, Nova Scotia and Quebec, the "Director of Public Prosecutions" (or Direction générale des poursuites publiques) is responsible for criminal cases. In other provinces, the office is referred to as the "Crown Attorney's Office" or a similar title.

For federal criminal cases, the Public Prosecution Service of Canada is the responsible entity.

List of offices across Canada
Alberta - Chief Crown Prosecutor - Crown Prosecutor's Office
British Columbia - Director of Public Prosecution - Office of Public Prosecution
Manitoba - Chief Crown Attorney - Manitoba Prosecution Service
New Brunswick - Chief Crown Prosecutor - Crown Prosecutors Office
Newfoundland and Labrador - Chief Crown Prosecutor - Public Prosecution Office
Nova Scotia - Chief Crown Attorney - Office of Public Prosecution
Ontario - Chief Crown Attorney - Crown Attorney's Office
Prince Edward Island - Chief Crown Attorney - Crown Attorneys' Office 
Quebec -  Director of Criminal and Penal Prosecutions - Office of the Director of Criminal and Penal Prosecutions
Saskatchewan - Chief Crown Prosecution - Public Prosecution Office
Yukon - Chief Crown Prosecution - Crown Prosecution Office
Northwest Territories - Chief of Public Prosecution - Office of Public Prosecution
Nunavut - Director of Public Prosecution - Public Prosecution Service of Canada

See also
 Director of Public Prosecutions
 District attorney

References

Sources
 Criminal Law Division - Crown Attorney System

Prosecution
Canadian criminal law